Maryam Yakubova (12 May 1931 in Urgench – 10 April 2018?) was an Uzbek teacher.

Yakubova won top honors for her academic achievements while in secondary school, from which she graduated in 1948.She studied school No.1 in Urgench. She graduated from the Khorezm Pedagogical State Institute with a degree in specialty teacher of mathematics, physics in 1952, whereupon she returned to her native school No. 1 Urgench city. There she began working as a teacher of mathematics physics, continuing until 1958. In that year she was named the head of the Urgench city department of public education, continuing in the position until 1962, when she became the director of health boarding school No. 94 Urgench city. This post she held until 1992. 

Yakubova received numerous awards during her career for her services to education. In 1958 she was named an Honored Professor of Public Education in the Uzbek SSR, and in 1978 she was named an Honored Teacher of Uzbekistan, and in 1986 she was named a People's Teacher of the USSR. For her accomplishments she also received the Order of Lenin and the Order of the Presidium of the Uzbek SSR, among other decorations.

References

1931 births
Uzbekistani educators
Women educators
People from Xorazm Region
20th-century educators
Recipients of the Order of Lenin
Possibly living people